Lacolle is a municipality in southern Quebec, Canada, located in the administrative area of the Montérégie, on the Canada–United States border. The population as of the Canada 2011 Census was 2,680. The Lacolle River runs eastward through the middle of the town and empties in Richelieu River. More people cross the border illegally from the United States there than at any other point. Almost nineteen thousand people were detained in 2017. The nearest town across the border is Champlain, New York.

History

The written history of Lacolle can be traced back to July 4, 1609, when Samuel de Champlain and his entourage stopped briefly at the mouth of a small stream for a meal before continuing southward up the Richelieu River into the lake which now bears his name. In his journal, Champlain referred to the location of the delta as "Lacole". When translated literally, the term means the neck of a bottle or that which is above the shoulders.

Lacolle was the site of three battles in the early 19th Century. Two of the battles took place during the War of 1812. The Battle of Lacolle Mills (1812) was a short engagement in which a small garrison of Canadien Militia, with the assistance of Kahnawake Mohawk warriors, defended a makeshift log blockhouse from an American invasion force led by Major General Henry Dearborn. In the Battle of Lacolle Mills (1814) a garrison of 80 men of the 13th Regiment of Foot and a Congreve rocket detachment of the Royal Marine Artillery, later reinforced by a company of the Canadian Voltigeurs and the Grenadier company of the Canadian Fencibles successfully defended a blockhouse and stone mill building from an attacking American force of 4,000 men led by Major General James Wilkinson.

The Battle of Lacolle was fought on November 7, 1838, between Loyal Lower Canada volunteer forces under Major John Scriver and Lower Canada rebels under Colonel Ferdinand-Alphonse Oklowski. The half hour battle ended in a rebel defeat.

Demographics

Population

Language

Industry

Lacolle as a small industrial park featuring Arneg Inc, Soudure HMC inc, and a Recycling complex operated by Compo Haut-Richelieu inc. (headquartered in St-Jean-sur-Richelieu).

Education

The South Shore Protestant Regional School Board previously served the municipality.

See also
List of municipalities in Quebec
Lacolle Mills Blockhouse
Battle of Lacolle Mills (1812)
Battle of Lacolle Mills (1814)
Battle of Lacolle (1838)
Lacolle railway station
Municipal reorganization in Quebec
Richelieu River

References

External links

Lacolle official website
A Lacolle Chronology as it pertains to the English Settlers

Municipalities in Quebec
Incorporated places in Le Haut-Richelieu Regional County Municipality